Mahapurna was one of the teachers of the medieval Vaishnavite philosopher Ramanuja. He was responsible for initiating Ramanuja into Sri Vaishnavism.

Life
Mahapurna was born in a Chozhiyar family and lived in the eleventh or twelfth century AD. He was a disciple of Yamunacharya whom he helped with the management of the Ranganathasamy temple at Srirangam.

He was instrumental in bringing Ramanuja into the Sri Vaishnavite fold and initiated the latter after performing the Pancha Samskara ceremony at Madurantakam, a place located 40 km from present day Chennai.

References

See also
Hindu reform movements

12th-century Indian philosophers

Indian Hindu spiritual teachers

Sri Vaishnava religious leaders

Vedanta
Vaishnava saints

Medieval Hindu religious leaders
11th-century Indian philosophers
Indian Vaishnavites
People from Kanchipuram district

Year of birth missing (living people)
Living people